Piz Vizan is a mountain of the Swiss Lepontine Alps, overlooking Andeer in the canton of Graubünden. It lies at the eastern end of the range east of Pizzas d'Anarosa.

References

External links
 Piz Vizan on Hikr

Mountains of Graubünden
Mountains of the Alps
Lepontine Alps
Mountains of Switzerland
Two-thousanders of Switzerland
Muntogna da Schons
Andeer